Best Friends is a children's novel by Jacqueline Wilson, first published in 2004.

Plot
Eleven-year-olds Gemma Jackson and Alice Barlow are best friends, ever since they were born on the same day and were in the same hospital. Gemma is a tomboy who likes playing wild and exciting sporty games. Alice is very girly girl who loves the color pink and enjoys ballet. Despite their differences and opinions, the two girls spend almost every single day together, and on their birthdays they always wish to stay friends forever.

One day though, Gemma notices a change in Alice when she becomes miserable. Alice tells Gemma that she and her parents are moving to Scotland which is hundreds of miles away. Gemma and Alice are both devastated at the thought of being separated, but Alice's snobbish mother "Auntie Karen" claims that Alice will make new friends when they move. Not wanting this, Alice suggests that she and Gemma run away - and do so during the leaving party on the day before the move. Gemma suggests they catch a train to London. On the way they are recognized by Billy "Biscuits" McVitie whose baby sister was christened the same day (Biscuits' family were seen in the churchyard after the ceremony which Alice and Gemma passed en route to the train station); he tells his mother and she informs Alice's and Gemma's parents who catch the girls before they can board the train.

Gemma gets the blame when no one believes Alice's claims to it being her idea. At school, Gemma turns on Biscuits, who had been her mate, to being her worst enemy. But Biscuits remains polite to Gemma even after Gemma ambushes him at the boy's toilets. The two of them eventually get paired together for a school project contest about a famous person, to which Gemma ignores Biscuits despite agreeing to do the project on his celebrity choice, a famous TV chef called "Fat Larry". Gemma's Grandad then invites her on a car ride to Scotland where he needs to taxi an old lady to London. At the same time she can visit Alice and spend a day with her and Gemma happily agrees. Gemma fixes her friendship with Biscuits and he helps her bake a cake to take Alice so they can make the best friends wish.

Upon arrival at Alice's new massive house the two share a happy reunion and is allowed to stay for the day. During the visit Alice shows her new pink room and her new stuff. Later in the day Gemma meets Flora Hamilton, who is a classmate to Alice at her new school. But Gemma sees that Flora is trying to become Alice's best friend by showing off and treats Gemma's behavior as childish, she even lies that Alice claimed Gemma's family as being really poor. When the cake is presented to them at dinner Alice asks that she and Gemma cut the cake to make a wish. But Auntie Karen spitefully gives Flora the knife and she steals their wish. Gemma finally snaps and shoves the cake in Flora's face. 

Gemma is made to leave but Alice assures Gemma they are still best friends. On the ride home Gemma remains good as gold and helps her Grandad assist the old lady, Mrs. Cholmondly, who is very grumpy, pushy and demanding. When she gets home, Gemma and Biscuits' Fat Larry Project ends up winning the contest. On her birthday, Gemma is given loads of lovely presents. And after school Biscuits' family are invited to join Gemma's family to celebrate her birthday. After a dinner of takeaway pizza and birthday cake, Gemma receives a card from Alice saying that they will remain best friends forever despite no more contact.

Goof
In this book, Biscuits's surname is McVitie, but in Cliffhanger his surname is Baker, as Tim wrote a postcard to him with the name as Mr "Biscuits" Baker; this might be because Alice hates Biscuits, and McVitie's are a biscuits company, so she might be making fun out of him.

Main characters
 Gemma Jackson: Gemma is the story's main protagonist and narrator. She is a fairly tomboyish, hyperactive and clumsy 11 year old, who enjoys football, bike riding and spending time with her Grandad. She is Alice's best friend and is devastated when she learns that Alice is moving away to Scotland, having seen each other nearly every day since the cradle. She has two brothers Jack and Callum. Alice’s and her own parents blame her when she runs away with Alice. Gemma has a warm and optimistic disposition, and while her movements are described as "clumsy" and "un-ladylike" by her firmly disciplined mother, however, she has a delicacy and softness of heart which shines through when with her special friend, Alice.
 Alice Barlow: Gemma's best friend. In contrast to Gemma, she is quite the girly girl, who loves dressing up, ballet and the colour pink. She is also eleven. She appears traumatised when she and her parents move away to Scotland, having been parted from Gemma. However, she is spoiled with all sorts of glamorous items in their new home. She makes friends with snobby Flora. She writes Gemma a birthday card at the end of the book. While she is surrounded by fancy and elegant objects, lives in a beautiful countryside home and attends an ever so fancy school, all she truly wants is her best friend to be here, too.
 Billy "Biscuits" McVitie: The girls' schoolfriend, a tubby boy who loves food, both eating and cooking. Gemma and Alice form a temporary hatred for him when he "tells on them" to his mother about their plots on running away. When Alice is gone, Gemma and Biscuits become closer as friends and work together for a project on famous TV chef "Fat Larry", as well as Biscuits making Gemma her special birthday cake at her party. He is invited to Gemma's party. Towards the beginning, Gemma has a strong disliking for him which is shared by Alice, but as time slowly passes she realises what he did was out of care, and he just wants his special friend Gemma to be safe and happy. Biscuits is described as good-natured, kind and cheerful, as well as loved by all of his friends. 
 Flora Hamilton: A girl who befriends Alice in Scotland. Gemma often frets that Flora is trying to "take Alice away from her" and becomes highly suspicious of them together. Flora is very pretty, mature and also a good ballet dancer. She lets Gemma email her to communicate with Alice, something Gemma feels very uneasy about. During Gemma's visit to Scotland Flora is disdainful of Gemma's childish ways and tries to get Alice to do what she wants to do. She openly disapproves of Gemma and Alice's special friendship, much to Gemma's dismay. She ends up with the birthday cake in her face after Gemma loses her cool once and for all. She also renames Gemma's precious doll, Melissa, who was a gift from her beloved grandmother, who died at an early stage of Gemma's life. This upsets Gemma very deeply, and her strong emotion only grows.
 Grandad: Gemma's beloved grandfather. He has a very caring, calm and soft temperament, and loved Gemma very deeply. He has affectionately nicknamed Gemma as his little Iced Gem, after the popular biscuit, and she openly expresses that she believes he is the only person in the world who understands her true feelings and sees her beautiful true colours, besides Alice, of course. He is sensitive to Gemma's emotions, and it is said that even he shed a tear at Gemma and Alice's emotional, heartwarming reunion. He is summarised as the loveliest man in the whole world by his special little Gem.

Television series
See: Best Friends (TV Series)
In 2005, a five-part adaptation was produced by CITV. It followed the book closely, but with a few minor alterations and a new ending.

References 

British young adult novels
Novels by Jacqueline Wilson
Doubleday (publisher) books
2004 British novels